This is a list of Azerbaijan football transfers in the winter transfer window, by club. Only clubs of the 2021–22 Azerbaijan Premier League are included.

Azerbaijan Premier League 2021-22

Gabala

In:

Out:

Keşla

In:

Out:

Neftçi

In:

Out:

Qarabağ

In:

Out:

Sabah

In:

Out:

Sabail

In:

Out:

Sumgayit

In:

Out:

Zira

In:

Out:

References

Azerbaijan
Azerbaijani football transfer lists
2021–22 in Azerbaijani football